Jozef Kovalík was the defending champion, but did not participate this year.

Andreas Haider-Maurer won the tournament, defeating Carlos Berlocq in the final.

Seeds

Draw

Finals

Top half

Bottom half

References
 Main Draw
 Qualifying Draw

Maserati Challenger - Singles
2015 Singles